2013 was a year in the Gregorian calendar.

2013 may also refer to:

Albums
2013, a 2010 album by Ya Ho Wha 13
Dara 2013, a 2013 album by Dara Bubamara

Songs
"2013" (Primal Scream song)
"2013", a song by Ängie from Suicidal Since 1995
"2013", a song by the Arctic Monkeys from AM
"2013", a song by DJ Muggs and Ill Bill from Kill Devil Hills
"2013", a song by Françoiz Breut
"2013", a song written by Isabelle Antena
"2013", a song by Lee Bannon
"2013", a song by Louis Cheung
"2013", a song by m-flo from Expo Bōei Robot Gran Sonik
"2013", a song by Mr. SOS
"2013", a song by Royal-T